Mangu may refer to:

Places:
 Mangu, Burma, a village
 Mangu, Estonia, a village
 Mangu, Nigeria, a Local Government Area
 Mangu-dong, a dong (neighborhood) of Seoul, South Korea
 Mangu Station, a railway station in Seoul

People:
 Möngke Khan, sometimes spelled Mangu, fourth Great Khan of the Mongol Empire
 Roberto Mangou, French painter also known as Roberto Mangú
 , Dominican-born rapper 

Other uses:
 Mang'u High School, a national high school in Kenya
 Mangú (dish) a traditional dish from the Dominican Republic
 Mangu, the concept in the culture of the Zande people usually referred to as witchcraft
 Mangú (song), a 2016 song by pop-singer Becky G

See also
 Mangu Farm, a settlement in Kenya